Caladenia fragrantissima, commonly known as the scented spider orchid, is a plant in the orchid family Orchidaceae and is endemic to Victoria and South Australia. It is a ground orchid with a single hairy leaf and up to three creamy-white to yellowish-green flowers. It is possible that it is conspecific with Caladenia orientalis.

Description
The sepals and petals suddenly taper to long, thin, dark red to black glandular tips. The lateral sepals and petals slope downwards near their bases then have drooping tips. Flowering occurs in September and October.

This species is similar to Caladenia orientalis and Caladenia patersonii and is difficult to distinguish from them. It may not be a separate species from C. orientalis.

Taxonomy and naming
This caldenia was first formally described by William Henry Nicholls in 1940 and given the name Caladenia patersonii var. suaveolens. The description was published in The Victorian Naturalist from a specimen collected near Portland. In 1989, David Jones and Geoffrey Carr raised it to species status. The specific epithet (fragrantissima) is the superlative form of the Latin adjective fragrans meaning “smelling agreeably".

Distribution and habitat
The scented spider orchid grows in dense heath or heathy forest in well-drained soil in near-coastal areas between Nelson and Portland in Victoria and in the far south-east of South Australia.

Conservation
Caladenia fragrantissima is listed as  "endangered" under the Victorian Government Flora and Fauna Guarantee Act 1988 and as "vulnerable" in South Australia.

References

fragrantissima
Plants described in 1991
Endemic orchids of Australia
Orchids of Victoria (Australia)
Taxa named by David L. Jones (botanist)